Saranti is a small village in the Nicosia District of Cyprus, located near Lagoudera.

References

Communities in Nicosia District